Muggiano is a district (quartiere) of Milan, Italy, part of the Zone 7 administrative division of the city. It is located in western periphery, bordering on the comunes of Cesano Boscone, Cusago, Settimo Milanese, and Trezzano sul Naviglio. Before being annexed to Baggio (in 1869), which in turn was annexed to Milan, Muggiano used to an autonomous comune.

The name Muggiano is of Roman origin; the place used to be called Modianus, after the governor of its territory, named Modius.

Until the 1990s, Muggiano was mostly a scarcely populated, rural district, with a landscape dominated by cascine (farmhouses) and cultivated land. After that, a residential area has been created and the population has rapidly grown.

Muggiano is about 10 km from the centre of Milan. As a consequence, it mostly depends on the nearby urban centres of Cesano Boscone and Baggio.

Landmarks
The main landmarks of Muggiano are two well preserved, medieval cascine (Cascina Guascona and Cascina Guasconcina) and the notable church of Saint Marcellina.

Transportation
Muggiano is connected by bus 63 (approximately 15 minutes ride) to the Bisceglie stop of the Milan Metro subway. The Tangenziale ring road has an exit to Muggiano.

Districts of Milan
Former municipalities of Lombardy